St. Therese Educational Foundation of Tacloban Inc. (STEFTI) is a private school based in Tacloban, Leyte, Philippines for pre-elementary, elementary and secondary education, run by Christian Catholic educators. The school was established in 2001 by a group of teachers who had resigned from the St. Therese Christian Development Center Foundation Inc. STEFTI has more than 2,100 students and has two campuses in Tacloban in the Eastern Visayas region.

References

 

Schools in Tacloban
Catholic secondary schools in the Philippines
Catholic elementary schools in the Philippines
Educational institutions established in 2001
2001 establishments in the Philippines